Winterton is a surname. Notable people with the surname include:

Ann Winterton (born 1941), UK politician
George Winterton (1946–2008), Australian barrister
Sir Nicholas Winterton (born 1938), UK politician
Paul Winterton (1908-2001), UK journalist and novelist writing using noms-de-plume
Rosie Winterton (born 1958), UK politician